Ficulle is a comune (municipality) in the Province of Terni in the Italian region Umbria, located about 40 km southwest of Perugia and about 60 km northwest of Terni.  

Ficulle borders the following municipalities: Allerona, Fabro, Montegabbione, Orvieto, Parrano, San Venanzo.

History 
The origins of the town and the castle date back to the 11th century even though it is supposed to have been born in the beginning as a trading station of the Roman Empire. Because of the excellent territorial position, in the Middle Ages Ficulle was contended by two noble families: Monaldeschi and Filippeschi, both from Orvieto. It suffered their struggles until 1416 AD, when the town passed under control of the Papal States.

Main sights
Walls and Rocca (fortress)
Castello della Sala, founded in 1350
Medieval borough
Church of Santa Maria Vecchia (early 13th century)
Abbey of S. Niccolò al Monte Orvietano
Sanctuary of Madonna della Maestà

References

External links
Pages in Thayer's Gazetteer

Cities and towns in Umbria